Karazirikovo (Qarayerek) is a rural locality (a village) in Vanyshevsky Selsoviet, Burayevsky District, Bashkortostan, Russia. The population was 89 as of 2010. There are 3 streets.

Geography 
Karazirikovo is located 15 km northeast of Burayevo (the district's administrative centre) by road. Vanysh-Alpautovo is the nearest rural locality.

References 

Rural localities in Burayevsky District